Boulton's Namib day gecko (Rhoptropus boultoni), also known commonly as Boulton's slender gecko, is a species of lizard in the family Gekkonidae. The species is native to southern Africa.

Etymology
The specific name, boultoni, is in honor of American ornithologist Wolfrid Rudyerd Boulton.

Geographic range
R. boultoni is found in Angola, Namibia, and South Africa.

Habitat

Description
Dorsally, R. boultoni is olive-brown to dark grey, mottled with maroon. Ventrally, it is lighter gray to bluish gray.

Reproduction
R. boultoni is oviparous. The adult female lays a clutch of two eggs.

References

Further reading
Gates BC (2010). "Day Geckos of Damaraland: Rhoptropus barnardi Hewitt, 1926, Rhoptropus boultoni Schmidt, 1933, and Rhoptropus diporus Haacke, 1965". Gekko 6 (1): 56–60.
Loveridge A (1947). "Revision of the African Lizards of the Family Geckonidae". Bulletin of the Museum of Comparative Zoölogy at Harvard College 98: 1–469. (Rhoptropus boultoni boultoni, pp. 291–292).
Rösler H (2000). "Kommentierte Liste der rezent, subrezent und fossil bekannten Geckotaxa (Reptilia: Gekkonomorpha)". Gekkota 2: 28–153. (Rhoptropus boultoni, p. 109). (in German).
Schmidt KP (1933). "The Reptiles of the Pulitzer Angola Expedition". Annals of the Carnegie Musem 22 (1): 1–15. (Rhoptropus boultoni, new species, p. 7).

Rhoptropus
Geckos of Africa
Reptiles of Angola
Reptiles of South Africa
Reptiles of Namibia
Reptiles described in 1933
Taxa named by Karl Patterson Schmidt